Wye Road is a major arterial road and rural highway that links Sherwood Park from Anthony Henday Drive (Highway 216) on the east side of Edmonton to Highway 14 west of Tofield. It is preceded by Sherwood Park Freeway, and east of Highway 21 is designated as Alberta Provincial Highway No. 630, commonly referred to as Highway 630. Wye Road is part of a  continuous roadway that runs through Sherwood Park, Edmonton, and St. Albert that includes Sherwood Park Freeway, Whyte Avenue, portions of University Avenue and Saskatchewan Drive, Groat Road, and St. Albert Trail.

Wye Road in Strathcona County, is a historic route from the early 1900s connecting Edmonton to Cooking Lake, parallel to a line of the Canadian National Railway, and it and Highway 630 used to be synonymous for their entire length. In the early 1990s, the portion of Highway 630 east of North Cooking Lake was realigned, resulting in the Highway 630 entering Beaver County and passing through Lindbrook and subsequently paved, while the original gravel route is still designated as Wye Road and links with Highway 14 near Hastings Lake. The portion of Wye Road within Sherwood Park is maintained by Strathcona County and not officially part of Highway 630.

Major intersections 
Starting from the west end of Wye Road:

See also 

 Transportation in Edmonton

References 

630
Roads in Strathcona County